Kuweires Military Aviation Institute is an airbase and military aviation institute in Aleppo Governorate, Syria. It is situated some 30 km east of the city of Aleppo, to the northeast of Kuweires Sharqi village, between As-Safira in the West and Dayr Hafir in the East.

The base was constructed with Polish support in the late 1960s as the primary base of the Syrian air force academy. The base is home to the Military Aviation Institute (originally opened in Damascus in 1947) of the Syrian Arab Air Force since 1980. The Military Aviation Institute was renovated between 2017–2021 and reopened in 2021.

Siege during the Syrian civil war

 

Kuweires Airbase was defended mostly by cadets when it fell under siege by rebels in 2013. Rebel forces surrounded Kuweiris for more than a year but did not overrun it. As rebel infighting with ISIS intensified, ISIS took control of the siege around late 2013. ISIS besieged the airbase for two years, deploying heavy weapons and armoured vehicles like suicide tank VBIEDs. ISIS negotiators called up officers on the phone and urged them to surrender and shelled the base with leaflets promising safe passage, but no one defected. Twice ISIS breached the perimeter of the airbase, even reaching as far as the hardened aircraft shelters where the defenders lived, but could not capture it.

Colonel Suheil al-Hassan and his Tiger Forces finally broke the siege on November 10, 2015, as part of the Kuweires offensive. Only 300 of 1,100 soldiers survived the siege.

The Syrian government repaired the base immediately after lifting the siege, deploying a squadron of Aero L-39 Albatros fighter-bombers together with a Buk M1 surface-to-air missile system, operated by a combined Russian and Syrian crew, to defend the base.

See also
List of Syrian Air Force bases

References

External links 
 Wikimapia

Military installations of Syria
Sieges of the Syrian civil war
Syrian Air Force bases
Dayr Hafir District
Universities in Syria